Baba Nazar (also Romanized as Bābā Naz̧ar; also known as Bābā Nazar) is a village in Chaman Rural District, Takht-e Soleyman District, Takab County, West Azerbaijan Province, Iran. At the 2006 census, its population was 679, in 146 families.

References 

Populated places in Takab County